Grind is a 2003 American skateboarding comedy film directed by Casey La Scala, and written by record producer Ralph Sall, who also composed the score. The film stars Mike Vogel, Vince Vieluf, Adam Brody and Joey Kern as four teenage aspiring amateur skaters trying to make it in the world of pro skateboarding by pulling insane stunts in front of their pro skater idol. It was critically panned and flopped at the box office, but has been received more positively by audiences.

Plot
Following high school graduation, skateboarder Eric Rivers and his best friends, goal-oriented workaholic Dustin Knight and misfit slacker Matt Jensen, have one last summer road trip together to follow their dream of getting noticed by the pro skater world — and getting paid to skate. When the legendary Jimmy Wilson's demo tour comes through, the boys figure that as soon as he sees their fierce tricks, he'll sign them up for his renowned team immediately, right? Unfortunately, the guys are intercepted by Wilson's road manager and can't get their foot in the door, much less their boards. Following their dream — and Wilson's national tour — the trio start their own skate team, reluctantly sponsored by Dustin and his college fund.

After recruiting laid-back ladies man "Sweet" Lou Singer to join their crew and provide the van for their tour, team Super Duper launches the ride of their lives in an outrageous road trip from Chicago to Santa Monica. The professional scene doesn't exactly welcome nobody, but these outsiders stick together through extreme misadventures. In their quest to go pro, they meet professional vert skating champions Bucky Lasek, Bob Burnquist and Pierre Luc Gagnon, skate pro Bam Margera and his crew Preston Lacy, Ehren Danger McGhehey and Jason Wee Man Acuña, as well as sexy skate chick Jamie as they grind handrails across America and force the skateboarding world to give 'em a piece of the action.

Cast

Soundtrack

A soundtrack consisting of a blend of rock, hip hop and reggae music was released on August 12, 2003 by Atlantic Records.

Critical response
Despite largely negative reviews from critics, Grind was received positively by audiences. Review aggregator Rotten Tomatoes gives the film an 8% based on 74 reviews, with an average score of 3.4/10 but with a high 79% audience approval rating. The site's consensus states: "Mediocre skateboard stunts are padded by a half-baked plot and one-dimensional characters." Metacritic shows an average of 30 out of 100 based on 24 reviews, indicating "generally unfavorable reviews".

Joe Laydon, of Variety called the "Skating scenes ... unremarkable and repetitious," concluding that the film was less than good. Keith Phipps, for The A.V. Club, said "The film ... will gleam the cube only of viewers with an unusually high tolerance for porta-toilet and Dutch-oven gags."

References

External links
 
 
 
 
 
 
 

2003 films
American comedy road movies
2000s buddy comedy films
2000s sports comedy films
2003 directorial debut films
American buddy comedy films
American sports comedy films
Warner Bros. films
Skateboarding films
2000s comedy road movies
American high school films
2003 comedy films
American teen comedy films
2000s English-language films
2000s American films